26S protease regulatory subunit 8, also known as 26S proteasome AAA-ATPase subunit Rpt6, is an enzyme that in humans is encoded by the PSMC5 gene. This protein is one of the 19 essential subunits of a complete assembled 19S proteasome complex Six 26S proteasome AAA-ATPase subunits (Rpt1, Rpt2, Rpt3, Rpt4, Rpt5, and Rpt6 (this protein))  together with four non-ATPase subunits (Rpn1, Rpn2, Rpn10, and Rpn13) form the base sub complex of 19S regulatory particle for proteasome complex.

Gene 

The gene PSMC5 encodes one of the ATPase subunits, a member of the triple-A family of ATPases which have a chaperone-like activity. In addition to participation in proteasome functions, this subunit may participate in transcriptional regulation since it has been shown to interact with the thyroid hormone receptor and retinoid X receptor-alpha.  The human PSMC5 gene has 13 exons and locates at chromosome band 17q23.3.

Protein 

The human protein 26S protease regulatory subunit 8 is 45.6kDa in size and composed of 406 amino acids. The calculated theoretical pI of this protein is 8.23.

Complex assembly 

26S proteasome complex is usually consisted of a 20S core particle (CP, or 20S proteasome) and one or two 19S regulatory particles (RP, or 19S proteasome) on either one side or both side of the barrel-shaped 20S. The CP and RPs pertain distinct structural characteristics and biological functions. In brief, 20S sub complex presents three types proteolytic activities, including caspase-like, trypsin-like, and chymotrypsin-like activities. These proteolytic active sites located in the inner side of a chamber formed by 4 stacked rings of 20S subunits, preventing random protein-enzyme encounter and uncontrolled protein degradation. The 19S regulatory particles can recognize ubiquitin-labeled protein as degradation substrate, unfold the protein to linear, open the gate of 20S core particle, and guide the substate into the proteolytic chamber. To meet such functional complexity, 19S regulatory particle contains at least 18 constitutive subunits. These subunits can be categorized into two classes based on the ATP dependence of subunits, ATP-dependent subunits and ATP-independent subunits. According to the protein interaction and topological characteristics of this multisubunit complex, the 19S regulatory particle is composed of a base and a lid subcomplex. The base consists of a ring of six AAA ATPases (Subunit Rpt1-6, systematic nomenclature) and four non-ATPase subunits (Rpn1, Rpn2, Rpn10, and Rpn13). Thus, 26S protease regulatory subunit 4 (Rpt2) is an essential component of forming the base subcomplex of 19S regulatory particle. For the assembly of 19S base sub complex, four sets of  pivotal assembly chaperons (Hsm3/S5b, Nas2/P27, Nas6/P28, and Rpn14/PAAF1, nomenclature in yeast/mammals) were identified by four groups independently. These 19S regulatory particle base-dedicated chaperons all binds to individual ATPase subunits through the C-terminal regions. For example, Hsm3/S5b binds to the subunit Rpt1 and Rpt2 (this protein), Nas2/p27 to Rpt5, Nas6/p28 to Rpt3, and Rpn14/PAAAF1 to Rpt6 (this protein), respectively. Subsequently, three intermediate assembly modules are formed as following, the Nas6/p28-Rpt3-Rpt6-Rpn14/PAAF1 module, the Nas2/p27-Rpt4-Rpt5 module, and the Hsm3/S5b-Rpt1-Rpt2-Rpn2 module. Eventually, these three modules assemble together to form the heterohexameric ring of 6 Atlases with Rpn1. The final addition of Rpn13 indicates the completion of 19S base sub complex assembly.

Function 

As the degradation machinery that is responsible for ~70% of intracellular proteolysis, proteasome complex (26S proteasome) plays a critical roles in maintaining the homeostasis of cellular proteome. Accordingly, misfolded proteins and damaged protein need to be continuously removed to recycle amino acids for new synthesis; in parallel, some key regulatory proteins fulfill their biological functions via selective degradation; furthermore, proteins are digested into peptides for MHC class I antigen presentation. To meet such complicated demands in biological process via spatial and temporal proteolysis, protein substrates have to be recognized, recruited, and eventually hydrolyzed in a well controlled fashion. Thus, 19S regulatory particle pertains a series of important capabilities to address these functional challenges. To recognize protein as designated substrate, 19S complex has subunits that are capable to recognize proteins with a special degradative tag, the ubiquitinylation. It also have subunits that can bind with nucleotides (e.g., ATPs)  in order to facilitate the association between 19S and 20S particles, as well as to cause confirmation changes of alpha subunit C-terminals that form the substate entrance of 20S complex.

The ATPases subunits assemble into a six-membered ring with a sequence of  Rpt1–Rpt5–Rpt4–Rpt3–Rpt6–Rpt2, which interacts with the seven-membered alpha ring of 20S core particle and establishes an asymmetric interface between the 19S RP and the 20S CP. Three C-terminal tails with HbYX motifs of distinct Rpt ATPases insert into pockets between two defined alpha subunits of the CP and regulate the gate opening of the central channels in the CP alpha ring. Evidence showed that ATPase subunit Rpt5, along with other ubuiqintinated 19S proteasome subunits (Rpn13, Rpn10) and the deubiquitinating enzyme Uch37, can be ubiquitinated in situ by proteasome-associating ubiquitination enzymes. Ubiquitination of proteasome subunits can regulates proteasomal activity in response to the alteration of cellular ubiquitination levels.

Interactions 

PSMC5 has been shown to interact with:
 PSMC3,
 PSMC4,
 Sp1 transcription factor,  and
 XPB.

Children with PSMC5 Mutations 

As of 2021, only 18 reports of children with PSMC5 mutations have been discovered. <GeneMatcher>  There is one foundation that is performing research with children who has PSMC5 mutations called PSMC5 Foundation, www.psmc5.org.  The aim is to find therapies and learn more about how to resolve issues with mutations.  The common effects have been developmental delays, ranging from motor delays to minimal expressive language.

References

Further reading